Firestone Community Learning Center (Firestone CLC), previously known as Harvey S. Firestone High School, is a public high school located on the northwest side of Akron, Ohio. It is one of seven high schools in the Akron Public Schools. The high school currently offers programs such as the Akron School for the Arts, International Baccalaureate Program, Project Lead The Way, Advanced Placement classes, and Firestone Theatre. Opened in 1963, Firestone is named after the founder of the Firestone Tire and Rubber Company, Harvey Firestone.  Firestone has been named as one of the top 1,000 public high schools in the United States for its AP and IB programs by Newsweek in 2003, 2005, 2006, and 2007. Firestone opened a new building for the 2016–17 school year.

State championships
 Boys Swimming - 1966,1969,1982,1983, 1986 State of Ohio chess champions

National championships
Boys Swimming - 1999 (public), 2000, 2002

Notable alumni
 Joseph Arthur, singer-songwriter-artist
 Dan Auerbach, guitarist and vocalist for The Black Keys 
 Patrick Carney, drummer for The Black Keys 
 Ralph Carney, avant garde saxophonist and clarinet player, singer, composer; member of Tin Huey, session multi-instrumentalist 
 Phil "Flip" Boggs, gold medalist in springboard diving at 1976 Summer Olympics
 Keith Dambrot (born 1958), college basketball coach
 Tim Easton, singer-songwriter and artist
 Angie Everhart, model and actress
 Mark Gangloff, 2004 and 2008 Olympic gold medalist in swimming
 All five members of indie-pop band Houseguest (band)
 Lisa Howard, actress/singer
 Chrissie Hynde, leader of band The Pretenders, inducted into Rock and Roll Hall of Fame
 Melina Kanakaredes, actress
 Mark Mitten, Academy Award nominated film producer, Emmy Award winner
 Alan Myers, drummer for new wave band Devo
 Judith Resnik, second American woman in space, and second Jewish astronaut; killed in the Space Shuttle Challenger disaster in 1986
 Mark Schubert, head of U.S. swim team
 Rachel Sweet, pop singer and actress, attended Firestone High in 1970s and mentioned school in lyrics of "Who Does Lisa Like?" on 1978 album Fool Around
 Craig Yoe, publisher and designer
 Emilia Sykes U.S. representative for Ohio's 13th congressional district

Notes and references

External links
 

High schools in Akron, Ohio
Public high schools in Ohio
International Baccalaureate schools in Ohio